Ursid may refer to:

 Ursidae, the taxonomy family of bears
 Ursids, a meteor shower